Behind the High Wall is a 1956 American film noir crime film directed by Abner Biberman starring Tom Tully and Sylvia Sidney.

It featured an early performance by John Gavin who had just signed with Universal. It was sometimes referred to as his first film although he had appeared in Raw Edge under another name. In March 1956 it was said "John Gilmore" was in the film but in the credits he is called "John Gavin".

Plot
Inmates pull a prison break, taking the warden and another prisoner as hostages. But when the car gets into a crash, killing the others, the warden makes off with the gang's loot and places the blame on the other hostage.

Cast
 Tom Tully as Warden Carmichael
 Sylvia Sidney as Hilda Carmichael
 Betty Lynn as Anne MacGregor
 John Gavin as Johnny Hutchins 
 Don Beddoe as Todd MacGregor
 John Larch as William Kiley
 Barney Phillips as Tom Renolds 
 Ed Kemmer as Charlie Rains
 John Beradino as Carl Burkhardt
 Rayford Barnes as George Miller 
 Nicky Blair as Roy Burkhardt
 David Garcia as Morgan
 Peter Leeds as First Detective 
 James Hyland as Second Detective (as Jim Hyland)

References

External links

review of film at Noir of the week

1956 crime drama films
Film noir
Universal Pictures films
1956 films
American crime drama films
American black-and-white films
1950s English-language films
1950s American films